Karamanov is a surname. Notable people with the surname include:
Aco Karamanov (1927-1944), Macedonian or Bulgarian poet and partisan
 Alemdar Karamanov (1934-2007), Russian-Ukrainian composer
 Evgeni Karamanov (born 1986), Bulgarian footballer
 Ivan Karamanov (born 1981), Bulgarian footballer

See also
4274 Karamanov, a minor planet named in honour of Alemdar Karamanov